Shota Kveliashvili (1 January 1938 – 25 April 2004) was a Georgian sports shooter. He competed at the 1964 Summer Olympics and the 1968 Summer Olympics. In the 300 metre rifle event at the 1964 Olympics, he won a silver medal.

References

1938 births
2004 deaths
Soviet male sport shooters
Male sport shooters from Georgia (country)
Olympic shooters of the Soviet Union
Shooters at the 1964 Summer Olympics
Shooters at the 1968 Summer Olympics
Olympic silver medalists for the Soviet Union
Olympic medalists in shooting
Medalists at the 1964 Summer Olympics
Sportspeople from Tbilisi